Eve of the War is a six-track extended play from the Australian progressive metal band, Alchemist. The EP was released by Shock Records through its subsidiary label Thrust in November 1998. The title track, "Eve of the War" is a cover version of the opening piece from the British 1978 album, Jeff Wayne's Musical Version of The War of the Worlds. The EP has two live songs: "Yoni Kunda" first released on Lunasphere (May 1995), and "Chinese Whispers" from Spiritech (June 1997). The other tracks are a remix of "Yoni Kunda", and two re-mastered tracks from Jar of Kingdom (October 1993). A music video of the title track was provided.

The EP is now deleted, "Eve of the War" and the live version of "Chinese Whispers" were later included on their compilation album, Embryonics (November 2005).

Track listing

Personnel 

Alchemist
 Adam Agius – vocals, guitar, keyboards
 John Bray – bass guitar
 Rodney Holder – drums
 Roy Torkington – guitar

Other musicians
 Josh Nixon – guitar (on track 1)
 Mark Rochelle – keyboards

Recording details
 Audio engineer – D. W. Norton at Backbeach Studios, Rye, Victoria, June, August 1998
 Producer – D. W. Norton, Martin Shepherd (tracks 2–3), Simon (tracks 2–3) at the Disco Playpen
 Mixing engineer – Martin Shepherd (track 4)
 Audio engineer – Chock (tracks 2–3) at the Gypsy Bar
 Tracks 5 and 6 re-mastered from Jar of Kingdom

Artwork details
 Roy Torkington – artwork, layout, design
 Simon – layout, design

References 

Alchemist (band) albums
1998 EPs